The Sammamish River (also known as Sammamish Slough) flows through north King County, Washington for about , draining Lake Sammamish into Lake Washington. Along its course, the Sammamish River flows through Redmond,  Woodinville, Bothell, and Kenmore.

The river is named after the native people who once lived along its entire length.

Course
The Sammamish River begins as an outlet on the north shore of Lake Sammamish, which in turn is fed by several creeks that make up the headwaters of the Sammamish River basin. The most important of these is Issaquah Creek.

The river flows north from the lake through the city of Redmond. The tributary Bear Creek joins the Sammamish from the east, also containing the waters from Evans Creek and Cottage Lake Creek.

After passing through Redmond and parts of unincorporated King County, the Sammamish enters Woodinville where it turns northwest and then west. Little Bear Creek joins the Sammamish at this western turning point from the north. The river continues to bend in a generally westward direction, where it is joined from the north by North Creek in Bothell near the University of Washington, and Swamp Creek in Kenmore.

The Sammamish River enters Lake Washington on the west side of Kenmore.

The Sammamish River basin covers an area from Everett in the north to May Valley in the south. It is part of the larger Lake Washington-Cedar River drainage
. The total basin drainage area covers approximately 626 km2 (242 mi2), including the surface of Lake Sammamish. Big Bear Creek is the largest of the four major tributaries that feed the river followed by Little Bear Creek, North Creek, and Swamp Creek. There is also a significant amount of more diffuse drainage, primarily originating from the hills and valley to the west of the river.

River modifications
The Sammamish River of the early 1900s has been extensively modified as a result of various human efforts to use the channel for navigation, to utilize the floodplain for agriculture, and to reduce flooding in the Sammamish River valley and Lake Sammamish.  Prior to major hydrologic modifications that began in the early 1900s, the river was wider and deeper and generally flowed more slowly due to a relatively small difference in elevation between Lake Sammamish and Lake Washington. Prior to these modifications, the river was known as Squak Slough (after a modified pronunciation of the native village at Issaquah) and was navigable over its entire length by shallow-draft steamers and was used to float logs and coal barges from Lake Sammamish to Lake Washington. The mouth of the river was east of its present position.

Although early drainage and navigation improvement efforts in the first couple of decades of the 20th century likely affected the form and function of the river, the most significant modifications occurred as a result of two largely federal-funded navigation and flood control projects.  The first major change occurred as a result of the reduction in the mean level and seasonal elevation range of Lake Washington in 1916 as part of the development of the Lake Washington Ship Canal and Lock system, which officially opened June 16, 1917. This effectively increased the elevation difference between Lake Sammamish and Lake Washington and increased the flow rate of the river. It also moved the mouth of the river westward.

The second major change resulted from a King County/ACOE channel dredging, straightening project completed in November 1964 that included construction of a weir at the Lake Sammamish source. This project practically eliminated flooding in the Sammamish River valley and reduced maximum flood elevations and seasonal water surface elevations in Lake Sammamish.  The weir was modified in 1998 to improve passage for anadromous salmon during low flow.

Natural history
The Sammamish River is home to several runs of salmon and trout, including chinook, coho, sockeye, kokanee, steelhead, and coastal cutthroat trout. The King County government is currently working on restoring fish habitat along the river.

Several species of birds and mammals are plentiful along the river, including waterfowl such as Canada geese, ducks, and the great blue heron. Bald eagles and beavers are also common sights near the river.

Recreation
The Sammamish River Trail is a paved bicycle and walking trail that runs along the river, from Marymoor Park in Redmond, to Bothell, where it connects to the Burke-Gilman Trail to Seattle. The Slough is also the main geographical feature of the former Wayne Golf Course in Bothell.  The river is also the home of Sammamish Rowing Association which is a non-profit community rowing facility based on King County Parks property on the West shore supporting recreational and competitive rowing for high school and adult rowers. The Sammamish Rowing facility and boathouse are West of the river, with the dock right along the West Shore of the river, opposite Marymoor Dog Park.

See also
List of rivers of Washington

References

External links
Sammamish Watershed
U.S. Geological Survey names query form

Rivers of King County, Washington
Rivers of Washington (state)